The term congruence principle may refer to any undertaking that seeks to align apparently disparate things. Specifically, it may refer to:
 In economics, the principle of fiscal equivalence, i.e., the false model in which the circle of buyers can be made to equate exactly with the circle of sellers.
 In education, the notion that principles such as Bloom's Taxonomy assist in maintaining congruence among various educational undertakings.
 In linguistics and etymology, the more contributing languages a linguistic feature exists in, the more likely it is to persist in the emerging language. See phono-semantic matching.
 In mathematics, the application of principles associated with Cavalieri's principle.
 In medicine, the corollary principle of metabolism that holds that "present-day metabolism holds traces of the primitive chemistry and could serve as a valuable source of inspiration in the elaboration of theories."
 In psychology, a corollary to the principle of cognitive dissonance, the notion that it is impossible for a person (or organisation) to live too long where there is incongruity between a belief and a behavior.  It's based on the principle of poetic justice.
 In taxonomy, two biological classifications have taxonomic congruence if it can be hypothesized that the two derive from the same theoretical phylogenetic tree.

See also
 Equivalence principle

References 

Principles